International Market may refer to:

 Jungle Jim's International Market
 Nampodong International Market
 Rungis International Market, Paris; see Marché international de Rungis
 Western International Market